Navajo Bakboord (born 29 January 1999) is a Dutch footballer who plays as a right back for Heracles Almelo.

Club career
Bakboord made his Eerste Divisie debut for Jong Ajax on 1 December 2017 in a game against MVV. On 23 May 2019 it has been announced that Bakboord signed with Heracles Almelo.

Personal life
Born in the Netherlands, Bakboord is of Surinamese descent.

References

External links
 
 Career stats & Profile - Voetbal International

1999 births
Living people
Footballers from Amsterdam
Dutch sportspeople of Surinamese descent
Association football defenders
Dutch footballers
Netherlands youth international footballers
Jong Ajax players
Heracles Almelo players
Eredivisie players
Eerste Divisie players